"Hitch Hike" is a 1962 song by Marvin Gaye, released on the Tamla label. Another song Gaye co-wrote (this time with Clarence Paul and William "Mickey" Stevenson). 

The single was successful enough to land Gaye his first top forty pop single in 1963 with "Hitch Hike" reaching number thirty on the pop singles chart while reaching number twelve on the R&B singles chart.

Background
This time instead of confessing to being stubborn, the singer is now hitchhiking on the look out for his girl, who he feels has run so far that he has to travel "around the world" thinking of places she could have found herself at including St. Louis, "Chicago City Limits" and "L.A."

The song sparked a brief dance craze when audience members from American Bandstand performed the "hitch hike" dance. Marvin performed the song on the show and also did the move onstage. The dance was also performed during Marvin's performance of the song in the T.A.M.I. Show.  Cash Box described it as "a fetching, shuffle beat cha cha blueser...that the chorus-backed Gaye decks out in potent r&b-pop style."  Like "Stubborn", Martha and the Vandellas accompanied Gaye on this song.

Personnel
Lead vocals by Marvin Gaye
Background vocals by The Vandellas: Martha Reeves, Rosalind Ashford and Annette Beard
Instrumentation by The Funk Brothers:
Robert White: guitar
Eddie Willis: guitar
Joe Messina: guitar
James Jamerson: bass
Marvin Gaye: drums and piano
Jack Ashford: tambourine, percussion
Earl Van Dyke: piano
Henry Cosby: tenor saxophone
Mike Terry: baritone saxophone
Thomas "Beans" Bowles: flute

Cover versions
The Mothers of Invention 
James & Bobby Purify released a version of the song on their 1967 album, James & Bobby Purify.
Paul McCartney performed a live cover of the song during his 2011 performance at Comerica Park in Detroit, Michigan. Another song which is likely based on "Hitch Hike" is "You Can't Do That" by The Beatles, especially the use of cowbell and congas and the pronounced stops at the end of each verse.
Martha and the Vandellas, who recorded backing vocals on the original version, covered it on their album Dance Party. Their version uses the original backing track with the Vandellas' backing vocals intact, in addition to Martha Reeves's lead vocal, Rosalind Ashford and Betty Kelly's harmony vocals, and added percussion from the Funk Brothers.
It was covered in 1965 by The Rolling Stones on their album Out Of Our Heads.
It was covered in 1966 by The Grass Roots on their first album Where Were You When I Needed You.
It was covered in 1966 by The Sonics on their album Boom (album).
It was covered in 1984 by Alison Moyet as the B-side of her single Invisible.
The Spiders (the first incarnation of the band Alice Cooper) recorded it as the B-side of their 1966 single "Why Don't You Love Me".

Influences
The Velvet Underground's song "There She Goes Again" is based on "Hitch Hike", as is the guitar intro to The Smiths' "There Is a Light That Never Goes Out" (Johnny Marr specifically credits The Rolling Stones' cover as the inspiration).

References

1962 songs
1963 singles
Songs written by Marvin Gaye
Songs written by Clarence Paul
Songs written by William "Mickey" Stevenson
Marvin Gaye songs
The Rolling Stones songs
James & Bobby Purify songs
Paul McCartney songs
Song recordings produced by William "Mickey" Stevenson
Tamla Records singles